The women's 400 metres hurdles event at the 2008 African Championships in Athletics was held at the Addis Ababa Stadium on May 3–May 4.

Medalists

Results

Heats
Qualification: First 3 of each heat (Q) and the next 2 fastest (q) qualified for the final.

Final

References
Results (Archived)

2008 African Championships in Athletics
400 metres hurdles at the African Championships in Athletics
2008 in women's athletics